State Highway 44 (SH 44) is a New Zealand state highway. At 5.2 km it is one of the shortest highways on the network. Its entire length is within the New Plymouth city area.

History
SH 44 was created in response to an increase in truck traffic between SH 3 and Port Taranaki and the resulting damage being caused to the preferred route (Breakwater Rd/St Aubyn St/Molesworth St). Initially Transit New Zealand was opposed to taking on the road as part of the highway network (making it responsible for the maintenance rather than the New Plymouth District Council) as for much of the route  is less than 200m away and runs in parallel. However, as SH 45 is a hillier route, uses the one-way network, and has a greater number of traffic lights insisting heavy vehicles use that route was not feasible and Transit eventually granted network status.

Route
The highway leaves  at the corners where Leach (westbound one-way) and Courtenay (eastbound one-way) Streets intersect with Eliot Street (north-south) just north-east of the New Plymouth CBD. This is the same place where SH 45 also commences. It continues along Eliot St to Molesworth Street then west along this stretch of road, which in turn becomes St Aubyn Street then Breakwater Road. While it terminates at Port Taranaki both entrances to the port are part of SH 44. The first is via Bayly Road and Ocean View Parade while the other is at the end of Breakwater Road.

See also
 List of New Zealand state highways
 List of roads and highways, for notable or famous roads worldwide

References

External links
 New Zealand Transport Agency

44
New Plymouth District
Transport in Taranaki